Bill Webb is a game designer who has worked primarily on role-playing games.

Career
Bill Webb and his old friend Clark Peterson formed Necromancer Games in the spring of 2000 to publish role-playing materials using the impending d20 license; on August 10, 2000, the same day Wizards of the Coast was to release the new Player's Handbook at GenCon 33, Peterson and Webb published a free PDF adventure called The Wizard's Amulet just a few minutes after midnight that same day. On September 13, 2000, Necromancer Games announced a partnership with White Wolf in forming their "Sword & Sorcery" imprint, and Peterson and Webb produced many of White Wolf's rulebooks including Creature Collection (2000), Relics & Rituals (2000), The Divine and The Defeated (2001), and Creature Collection II (2001).

Webb has since cofounded Frog God Games focusing on adventures designed for both the Pathfinder Roleplaying Game and Swords & Wizardry. Webb created Frog God Games to do his own publication; the parting was amicable and Necromancer passed on all rights to one of their final pseudo-publications, Slumbering Tsar, to Webb - complete with any Necromancer IP that might have been mixed in. Frog God also bought the existing Necromancer stock from White Wolf, Kenzer & Company and Troll Lord Games, with the books being warehoused in Webb's garage and started to sell the stock via eBay in May 2010.

Sexual harassment allegations
Webb has admitted to "inappropriate and unprofessional interactions" at PaizoCon 2017 towards Paizo representative BJ Hensley, who interpreted his behavior as sexual harassment. Public discussion of this behavior led to calls to boycott conventions hosting Webb as a guest and business partners publishing Frog God material; Webb withdrew from Gary Con 2019 and Steve Jackson Games offered partial refunds to backers of its The Fantasy Trip Kickstarter campaign (which contained a setting and adventures developed by Frog God) who wished to withdraw their support, though Steve Jackson indicated that future projects with the company were in progress and would not be canceled. In response, Frog God Games instituted a policy that Webb be accompanied by a company associate at all future conventions, and in a joint statement with Ms. Hensley pledged a $1000 donation to RAINN, along with the charitable portion of "one of their next charity bundles". Frog God Games also "reiterate[d] [their] request to [their] fans that they not make attacks on BJ in any way."

References

External links
 Bill Webb :: Pen & Paper RPG Database archive

Living people
Role-playing game designers
Year of birth missing (living people)